{{Infobox Basketball club
|color1        =White
|color2        =#333399
|name          =Al-Thawra SC
|logo          = 
|imagesize     =150px
| nickname     = (The Revolution)
|leagues       =Syrian Women Basketball League
| season =2020–21
| position =Syrian League, 1st of 10
|founded       =1946
|history       =Al-Thawra Damascus1946–present
|arena         = Al-Fayhaa Arena (capacity: 6000)
|location      = Damascus, Syria
|colors        =Blue and White  
|president     = 
|coach         = Abdullah Kammouneh
|championships = <small>(3) Syrian Women Basketball League  (4) Syrian Basketball Cup<small>
|website       =Official page
| h_body        = 333399
| h_pattern_b   = _thinredsides
| h_shorts      = 333399
| h_pattern_s   = _redsides
| a_body        = FFFFFF
| a_pattern_b   = _thinbluesides
| a_shorts      = FFFFFF
| a_pattern_s   = _bluesides
}}Al-Thawra SC is a major Syrian professional women's basketball club and department of Al Thawra Sports Club based in Damascus, Syria.

HonoursSyrian Women Basketball LeagueWinners (3): 2019 - 2021 - 2022Syrian Basketball CupWinners (4): 2019 - 2020 - 2021 - 2022Arab Women's Club Basketball ChampionshipRunners-Up (1): 2021Third place (1):''' 1990

Current roster
Squad for the 2021–2022 Syrian Basketball League season:

References

Basketball in Syria
Sports clubs in Syria
Basketball teams in Syria
Sport in Damascus
Basketball teams established in 1947
Sports clubs established in 1946
1946 establishments in Syria